The Mersey Pirate is a British children's television programme that was shown in 1979.

The programme's presenters were Duggie Brown, Frank Carson, Bernard Wrigley and Billy Butler. Actors Andrew Schofield and Ray Kingsley, who would later work together on the television series Scully, played stowaways. Various guests appeared on the series including The Dooleys, Bad Manners, The Undertones, and Star Wars star David Prowse (who was equally known in the UK for his persona as The Green Cross Code Man at the time).

Most ITV regions showed the programme, though several (including Tyne Tees, UTV and Channel Television) did not. The show had been due to run throughout the summer of 1979, but its run was cut short due to the ITV network strike that ran from August to October that year.

The show was prerecorded and used fake newspaper headlines to give appearance of being live.

The following year another Granada production, Fun Factory, took the Summer Saturday morning slot.

External links 
 
 The Mersey Pirate on Paul Morris' SatKids

1979 British television series debuts
1979 British television series endings
1970s British children's television series
English-language television shows
Fictional people from Liverpool
Fictional pirates
ITV children's television shows
Television series by ITV Studios
Television shows produced by Granada Television
Television shows set in Liverpool